Sydney Parkinson (c. 1745 – 26 January 1771) was a Scottish botanical illustrator and natural history artist.  He was the first European artist to visit Australia, New Zealand and Tahiti. Parkinson was the first Quaker to visit New Zealand.

Early life and family 
Parkinson was born in Edinburgh; his parents were the Edinburgh brewer Joel Parkinson, a Quaker, and his wife Elizabeth. He had a brother, Stanfield, and a sister, whose name was Britannia. The parents were members of the Edinburgh meeting of Quakers; John Fothergill was another member. Parkinson's father died in 1749, leaving the family in financial difficulties. Parkinson became apprentice of a woollen draper. According to his brother, he took "a particular delight in drawing flowers, fruits and other objects of natural history", becoming "so great a proficient in that stile of painting, as to attract the notice of the most celebrated botanists." While no direct evidence exists that Parkinson received formal training in art, he has been connected to William Delacour, who taught drawing and design at the Trustees' Academy, and may have been influenced by other Edinburgh artists.

London 

The family moved to London , where Parkinson's brother Stanfield worked as an upholsterer. In 1765 and 1766, some of Parkinson's flower paintings and drawings were shown at Free Society of Artists exhibitions. Parkinson began to give drawing lessons, and the Scottish nurseryman James Lee, a fellow Quaker, employed him as teacher to his daughter Ann. Lee introduced Parkinson to Joseph Banks in 1767. Through Banks, Parkinson also established contact with the zoologist Thomas Pennant. Parkinson produced copies of some animal paintings in the collection of Joan Gideon Loten, which were later published in some of Pennant's zoological books. His watercolours of birds of the Loten collection were painted in 1767, either from specimens or from drawings. Together with a fellow artist, Peter Paillou, Parkinson worked for Banks on the latter's collections from his 1766 voyage to Newfoundland and Labrador. He produced drawings and watercolour paintings of animals, from specimens preserved in alcohol or stuffed birds. When Banks planned a voyage to Sweden in order to meet Linnaeus in Uppsala and to see Lapland, he intended to take Parkinson as his draughtsman.

Voyage with Captain Cook 

Parkinson was employed by Joseph Banks to travel with him on James Cook's first voyage to the Pacific in 1768, in HMS Endeavour. Parkinson made nearly a thousand drawings of plants and animals collected by Banks and Daniel Solander on the voyage. He had to work in difficult conditions, living and working in a small cabin surrounded by hundreds of specimens. In Tahiti he was plagued by swarms of flies which ate the paint as he worked. He died at sea on the way to Cape Town of dysentery contracted at Princes' Island off the western end of Java. Banks paid his outstanding salary to his brother.

Before his travels Parkinson had taught illustration to Ann Lee, daughter of James Lee a Hammersmith nurseryman for whom he had made illustrations. In his will Parkinson left "whatever utensils that are useful in painting or drawing to Mr. Lee’s daughter, my scholar."

Journal 

Parkinson kept a journal on board the ship until shortly before his death in January 1771. While the fair copy of the journal was lost and never found, Stanfield Parkinson obtained some of his brother's papers from Banks in 1773, and decided to publish them earlier than John Hawkesworth's official publication of Cook's and Banks's journals. A legal injunction obtained by Hawkesworth prevented the publication until two days after his book had appeared on 10 June 1773.

Legacy 
Parkinson is commemorated in the common and scientific name of the Parkinson's petrel Procellaria parkinsoni. The great Florilegium of his work was finally published in 1988 by Alecto Historical Editions in 35 volumes and has since been digitized by the Natural History Museum in London.

In 1986 he was honoured on a postage stamp depicting his portrait issued by Australia Post.

The following are some examples of Parkinson's artistic work:

See also 
 Visual arts of Australia
 List of Australian botanical illustrators
 European and American voyages of scientific exploration

References

Sources

External links 
   Parkinson's posthumously published Journal, 1773, online at the National Library of Australia
   Examples of Parkinson's drawings published in A journal of a voyage to the South Seas, in His Majesty's ship, the Endeavour, 1773. Royal Geographical Society of South Australia

Further reading 
 de Bray, Lys (2001). The Art of Botanical Illustration: A history of classic illustrators and their achievements, pp. 72, 77. Quantum Publishing Ltd., London. .

1745 births
1771 deaths
British naturalists
James Cook
Scientific illustrators
Botanical illustrators
British bird artists
Scottish Quakers
People who died at sea
Artists from Edinburgh
Deaths from dysentery